William Woodward (14 October 1920 – 18 January 1987) was a British rower. He competed in the men's coxed four event at the 1948 Summer Olympics.

References

1920 births
1987 deaths
British male rowers
Olympic rowers of Great Britain
Rowers at the 1948 Summer Olympics